The Parcham Party of India ( abbreviation : PPI ) is a political party based primarily in the city of Aligarh, Uttar Pradesh India.  Its aim is to promote the social, economical, and educational development and effective representation of all communities in India. The sole aim of PPI is the political empowerment of Indian Muslims on the basis of their own political organization within the secular and democratic constitutional spirit of India.  PPI was founded by the Indian Muslim Political Conference on 13 April 2003 at an "Azm-e-millat" convention in Aligarh. The president of the party is Syed Ali Ameer.

Origins 
Parcham Party of India founded in 13 April 2003. Parcham Party founded by Late Saleem Peerzada, popularly known by the name of Lovey Bhai or Lovey Peerzada. The founder of the Parcham Party of India ( PPI ) was the front line torch bearer of the Aligarh Movement in its sense. He always kept the public interest of the community above the personal interest  and exhorted his companies and association for the same. He did not waved from his conviction even when the community  by and large did not reciprocate for his commitment. He remained firm and steadfast on his declarations and principles until last breath. Saleem Peerzada, exhibiting a character very rarely found in politicians, refused highly lucrative temptations and positions so often offered to him by different political parties.

History of Contested Elections by PPI

2007 UP Assembly Election 
PPI participated in the Uttar Pradesh 2007 Assembly election was in the alliance with Vishwanath Pratap Singh's Jan Morcha and contested on 5 seats.

2012 UP Assembly Election

2014 Loksabha Election

External links
 Party website
 party website

Political parties in Uttar Pradesh
Political parties established in 2003
Aligarh
2003 establishments in Uttar Pradesh